Mriganka is an Indian given name. Notable people with the name include:

Mriganka Sur (born 1953), Indian neuroscientist
Mriganka Mohan Sur (1889–after 1972), Indian politician
Mriganka Mahato (born 1963), Indian politician

Indian given names